Anna Carteret (born 11 December 1942) is a British stage and screen actress.

Biography
Carteret was born as Annabelle S. Wilkinson on 11 December 1942 in Bangalore, British India, the daughter of Peter John Wilkinson and his wife Patricia Carteret (Strahan). She was educated at Arts Educational Schools in Tring, Hertfordshire (now the Tring Park School for the Performing Arts), where she trained for the stage.

She was married to the television and film director Christopher Morahan for over forty years and often worked with him. The couple had two daughters, theatre director Rebecca and actress Hattie Morahan. In June 2019, Carteret spoke for the first time about living with bipolar disorder since she was a teenager.

Films, radio and television
Anna Carteret is best known for her role as police inspector Kate Longton in the BBC's long-running 1980s television series Juliet Bravo.

Other television credits include: The Saint, The Pallisers, Frederic Raphael's The Glittering Prizes, Eskimo Day, Star Maidens, Peak Practice, Holby City, and Casualty. In 1990, she was a contestant on Cluedo, facing off against John Stalker.

Films since 1959, include Dateline Diamonds (1965), The Plank (1967) and Mrs. Palfrey at the Claremont (2005). In 2012, she appeared in Private Peaceful. She portrayed Vivanti in Cats and Monkeys, co-starring with Jack Shepherd in a radio version of Catherine Shepherd's stage play, for BBC Radio 4's The Afternoon Play last broadcast on 19 November 2007.

Voice acting
Carteret has also voiced Miriam in the British/Welsh Christian animated television series Testament: The Bible in Animation and every female character in the British children's television series Forget Me Not Farm (Following the death of Mike Amatt (1949 - 2021, aged 71) who played Scarecrow, she is now the last surviving cast member of the show). Both of these shows aired on the BBC in the UK but only Testament aired on S4C in Wales.

References

Sources
 Who's Who in the Theatre; 17th ed. Gale (1981) 
 The National: The Theatre and its Work 1963–1997 by Simon Callow, Nick Hern Books/NT (1997) 
 Theatre Record and Theatre Record annual indexes

External links
 
 

1942 births
Living people
20th-century British actresses
21st-century British actresses
Actresses from Bangalore
British film actresses
British radio actresses
British stage actresses
British television actresses
British voice actresses
People educated at Tring Park School for the Performing Arts
People from Tring
People with bipolar disorder